Geltsdale is a hamlet and former civil parish, now in the parish of Castle Carrock, in the Carlisle district, in the county of Cumbria, England, to the southeast of Castle Carrock village. In 2001 the parish had a population of 6. On 1 April 2003 the parish was abolished and merged with Castle Carrock.

The Geltsdale Reservoir railway ran in the vicinity.

The local landscapes are under several levels of protection. Two of the protected areas cover a large area:
 the North Pennines Area of Outstanding Natural Beauty
 the North Pennines Moors Special Protection Area (147,276 ha)
Geltsdale & Glendue Fells Site of Special Scientific Interest has an area of 8,059 ha, and is one of the SSSIs which underlie the SPA.

Geltsdale RSPB reserve is a 5,000 ha nature reserve within the SSSI. It mainly moorland and is managed by the Royal Society for Protection of Birds for upland birds such as black grouse and hen harrier.

References

External links
 Cumbria County History Trust: Geltsdale Forest (nb: provisional research only – see Talk page)

Hamlets in Cumbria
Former civil parishes in Cumbria
City of Carlisle
Protected areas of Cumbria